Academia Deportiva Cantolao is a Peruvian football club based in the city of Callao, Peru. However, the club is mostly known for its youth academy. Their football academy is considered one of the best in Peru. Academia Cantolao has educated many players who have gone on to play in the Torneo Descentralizado (Peruvian top-flight) and abroad, including many Peruvian international players. Probably their most recognized graduate is former Bayern Munich striker Claudio Pizarro, one of the greatest Peruvian players in history.

History

Club

In the 1982 Copa Perú, the club classified to the Final Stage, but was eliminated by Atlético Grau and Atlético Torino.
In the 2015 Copa Perú, the club classified to the final against Defensor La Bocana to whom they lost. They were promoted to the Peruvian Segunda División for the first time in the club's history. After only one year in the first division the club won the 2016 Peruvian Segunda División. They defeated Sport Áncash by 2–0 in a play-off final after tying at the end of the season for first place with 53 points each and thus qualified for the 2017 Torneo Descentralizado.

Youth academy
Academia Cantolao as a youth academy currently educates players ranging from the U-8 level up to U-20.

Noted alumni

Honours

National

League
Peruvian Segunda División:
Winners (1): 2016
Runner-up (1): 1985

Copa Perú:
Runner-up (1): 2015

Regional
Liga Departamental del Callao:
Winners (2): 1981, 2015

Liga Distrital del Bellavista - La Perla:
Winners (2): 2014, 2015

Liga Distrital del Callao:
Winners (1): 1981

See also
List of football clubs in Peru
Peruvian football league system

References

External links
Academy official page.
Cosecha de cantera.

 
Football clubs in Peru
Association football clubs established in 1981
1981 establishments in Peru